The Telecommunication Engineering Centre is a body under telecom commission and a nodal agency of the Department of Telecommunications, Ministry of Communications and Information Technology, Government of India which is responsible for drawing up of standards, generic requirements, interface requirements, service requirements and specifications for telecom products, services and networks.

The Telecommunication Engineering Centre (TEC) is an "S&T" institution of Department of Telecommunications, Ministry of Communications and Information Technology, Government of India, with headquarters in New Delhi. It has four Regional Centres in New Delhi, Kolkata, Mumbai and Bangalore.

TEC Organization Chart:

SPECIALISED DIVISIONS :

The following Specialised divisions of TEC cover various telecom technology areas :

External Plant 
Information Technology 
Networks 
Optical Transmission 
Line Transmission

Radio Transmission 
Satellite Transmission 
Value Aided Services 
Switching 
Mobile Communications 
These divisions are responsible for standardisation and trials of new technologies. They have capabilities and human resources for testing of all kinds of telecom products, services and networks. The regional centres, as mentioned above, carry out test Interface Approvals and Service test certificates for telcom products and services.

TEC Certification
The TEC issues TEC certificates which cover the listed products. TEC Certification has been a voluntary process since 1991. However, as per announcement No. 10-1/2017-IT/TEC/ER, starting in 2019 the TEC will roll out the MTCTE (Mandatory Testing Certification of Telecommunication Equipment) regulations incrementally. Since 2019 many telecommunication products now require a mandatory product certification in India.

Products under the TEC approval scheme will have to meet electromagnetic compatibility (EMC/EMI) limits. The TEC registration process needs to be conducted by an Authorized Indian Representative. The product must be marked with an ID number (individual factory code), issued by the TEC.

The TEC certification allows a maximum of 10 models per TEC certificate.

International reports from ILAC-accredited test labs will only be accepted until March 31, 2020. After that all testing will be required to be done in India.

HUMAN RESOURCES :

TEC has a strength of 27 telecom professionals, 94 telecom engineers and 88 support staff for carrying out its responsibilities.

References
3. Documents Required for TEC Certification - Aleph INDIA

External Links

 Official website

Telecommunications authorities of India
Ministry of Communications and Information Technology (India)